Shawntinice Polk (March 27, 1983 – September 26, 2005) was an American women's basketball player who played at the University of Arizona.

Career
Despite playing only three seasons, she ranks fourth on the school's all time chart for points scored with 1,467 points. She has also compiled 914 rebounds, 222 blocks, 220 assists, 145 steals, and a 57.3 field goal percentage.

Arizona statistics

Source

Death
Shawntinice Polk died suddenly on the morning of September 26, 2005 when a pulmonary blood clot lodged (pulmonary embolism) in one of her lungs. It was a rare fatal occurrence for a healthy woman of her age. Polk is survived by her mother, Johnny Little, four older brothers and two older sisters. She was only 22 years old.

High school career
Attended Hanford High School in Hanford, California, where she was a four-year letterwinner in both basketball and volleyball.
Named a 2001 All-America first team by WBCA, Parade Magazine and USA Today.
Participated in the 2001 WBCA High School All-America Game where she scored eight points.
Recorded 2,163 points, 1,326 rebounds and 384 blocks, while leading Hanford to a 119-13 overall record during her high school career.
A three-time CIF All-Central Section honoree.
A four-time all-conference, all-city and all-county selection.
Averaged 16.1 ppg., 13.1 rpg. and 4.1 bpg. as a senior, while leading Hanford to a 31-2 record and the CIF Division II state championship.
Earned all-league honors in volleyball.

College career
Named WBCA All-America honorable mention in 2003, 2004 and 2005.
Three-time All-Pacific-10 Conference first team in 2003, 2004 and 2005.
Named to the 2005 Kodak All-Region 8 team
Two-time Associated Press All-America honorable mention in 2003 and 2004.
Named WBCA Player of the Month for Feb. 2004.
Three-time Pac-10 Player of the Week in 2004 and four-time Pac-10 Player of the Week in 2003.
Named the 2003 Pac-10 Freshman of the Year.
Selected 2003 All-Pac-10 and to the 2003 Pac-10 All-Freshmen Team.
Selected to the Freshmen All-America first team by Full Court Press and WomensCollegeHoops.com in 2003.
Named the MVP at the 2002 Fiesta Bowl Classic, averaged 20.5 ppg. and 13.5 rpg.
Named by Sports Illustrated as one of five collegiate women who are "Elevating the Game" (1/20/03).
Holds Career School Records for Blocked Shots (222), Double Doubles (46), and Rebounding Average (9.7 per game).

Notes

External links
Arizona Wildcats bio 
Player profile 
Star Arizona Basketball Player Dies In Tucson

1983 births
2005 deaths
American women's basketball players
Arizona Wildcats women's basketball players
Basketball players from California
Centers (basketball)
Deaths from pulmonary embolism
People from Hanford, California
20th-century American women